The 1982–83 Arkansas Razorbacks men's basketball team represented the University of Arkansas during the 1982–83 NCAA Division I men's basketball season. The head coach was Eddie Sutton, serving for his ninth year. The team played its home games in Barnhill Arena in Fayetteville, Arkansas. This team finished second in the SWC regular season standings, and lost in the semifinals of the conference tournament. In the 1983 NCAA Tournament, the Hogs defeated Purdue before losing to No. 1 seed Louisville in the Mideast regional semifinal.

Roster

Schedule and results

|-
!colspan=9 style=| Regular season

|-
!colspan=9 style=| SWC Tournament

|-
!colspan=9 style=| NCAA Tournament

Rankings

Awards and honors
Darrell Walker – Consensus Second-Team All-American

1983 NBA Draft

References

Arkansas Razorbacks men's basketball seasons
Arkansas
Arkansas
1982 in sports in Arkansas
1983 in sports in Arkansas